Black Racer may refer to:

Black Racer (DC Comics), a fictional character, a deity and avatar of Death in DC Comics universe
Black Racer (Marvel Comics), a fictional character, a supervillain in the Marvel Comics universe
Coluber constrictor, a species of non-venomous, colubrid snakes
Coluber constrictor constrictor, the northern black racer
Coluber constrictor priapus, the southern black racer

Animal common name disambiguation pages